The 2000–01 season saw St Johnstone compete in the Scottish Premier League where they finished in 10th position with 40 points.

Results
St Johnstone's score comes first

Legend

Scottish Premier League

Scottish Cup

Scottish League Cup

Final league table

References

External links
 St Johnstone 2000–01 at Soccerbase.com (select relevant season from dropdown list)

St Johnstone F.C. seasons
St Johnstone